Rhododendron eudoxum (华丽杜鹃) is a species of flowering plant in the Ericaceae family. It is native to the bamboo forests of southeast Xizang and northwest Yunnan, China, where it grows at altitudes of 3300–4300 meters. It is a dwarf shrub that typically grows to 0.3–1.2 m in height, with leathery leaves that are long-elliptic to oblong-obovate in shape, and 2.3–3 × 0.8–1.4 cm in size. Flowers are red.

References

Sources
 I. B. Balfour & Forrest, Notes Roy. Bot. Gard. Edinburgh. 11: 62. 1919.
 The Plant List
 Flora of China
 Hirsutum.com
 Danish Soc. of ARS

eudoxum
Taxa named by Isaac Bayley Balfour
Taxa named by George Forrest (botanist)